Mouhamadou Dabo (born 28 November 1986) is a French professional footballer who plays as a right-back, but has played left-back. He most recently played for Caen in Ligue 1.

Club career

Saint-Étienne
Born in Dakar, Dabo began his career with ASC Yeggo and he then joined French club Saint-Étienne's youth academy when he was 14 years old. In the summer of 2004 he was promoted to the club's senior team by manager Élie Baup. On 7 May 2005, Dabo made his debut for Saint-Étienne in a 2–0 win over Toulouse and made three appearances in total in his first season. Baup's successor Ivan Hašek put Dabo in the right-back position before newly manager Laurent Roussey switched him into the left-back role.

Dabo's second season proved to be the breakout year for the player as he received more playing time. On 21 September 2008, Dabo scored his first goal for Saint-Étienne against Paris Saint-Germain. The result was 1–0 in favor of Saint-Étienne. On 7 February 2009, Dabo scored an own goal against Caen. However, Saint-Étienne won the match 3–2 with goals from Bafétimbi Gomis and Ilan, who scored twice. In January 2009, club manager Alain Perrin told Le Progrès that Dabo, who had one year left on his contract at the time, refused all proposals on an extension.

Sevilla
Following his contract expiration, Dabo signed a four-year contract with Spanish club Sevilla on a free transfer, making him the first signing for the club. He made his debut for Sevilla in the first leg of the team's Supercopa de España tie against Barcelona on 14 August 2010. Two weeks later, Dabo made his league debut for Sevilla in a 4–1 win over Levante. On 19 December 2010, he received his first red card of his career after he kicked goal-scorer Ángel Di María in a 1–0 loss against Real Madrid.

Lyon
After just one season in Spain, in August 2011, Dabo returned to France signing a four-year contract with Lyon. The transfer fee was priced at €1 million plus a possible €800k in incentives. On 18 September 2011, Dabo made his debut for Lyon in a 2–0 win over Marseille after coming on a substitute for Anthony Réveillère. On 29 October 2011, he played his first match against his former club Saint-Étienne in a 2–0 win, but received a straight red card in the second half after foul on Bănel Nicoliță. In the Coupe de la Ligue, Dabo received his second red card of the season 2–1 win over Lille on 11 January 2012.

Troyes
Following his release by Lyon, Dabo completed a move to newly promoted Ligue 1 club Troyes on 14 October 2015. He made his Troyes debut on 25 October in an away match against Bordeaux in Ligue 1.

International career
Dabo earned 17 caps for the France national under-21 football team. He got his first call-up for France against Argentina on 11 February 2009.

Career statistics
.

Honours
Dabo has won two trophies in his career, firstly the 2011–12 Coupe de France and most recently the 2012 Trophée des Champions.

Lyon
Coupe de France: 2011–12
Trophée des Champions: 2012

References

Living people
1986 births
Association football fullbacks
French footballers
France under-21 international footballers
French sportspeople of Senegalese descent
Senegalese footballers
Footballers from Dakar
AS Saint-Étienne players
Sevilla FC players
Olympique Lyonnais players
ES Troyes AC players
Stade Malherbe Caen players
Ligue 1 players
Championnat National players
Championnat National 3 players
La Liga players
French expatriate footballers
Expatriate footballers in Spain